The Fourth Chen–Chiang summit was part of a series of the Chen-Chiang summit of cross-strait meetings held at Taichung, Taiwan. It was a meeting between the Association for Relations Across the Taiwan Straits (ARATS) and Straits Exchange Foundation (SEF).

Pre-meeting protest
Tens of thousands of opposition demonstrators marched through Taichung on December 20, 2009.  Police put Sunday's crowd in Taichung at 20,000-30,000. Some 500 officers were on hand to control the protesters.

Meeting
Representing mainland China's ARATs, Chen Yun-lin arrives in Taichung, Taiwan on December 21, 2009, for a 4-day trip to Christmas day December 25.  Both sides signed three agreements on agricultural, inspection and cooperations on quarantine, testing and certifications.  The double taxation was not signed.

Supporters of Taiwan Independence expressed their opposition against China's denial of Taiwanese sovereignty, military threats and Economic Cooperation Framework Agreement.

Injuries
One police officer was injured and six people were arrested after the officer fell from a truck as he tried to stop protesters from shooting fireworks at the hotel where Chen Yun-lin was staying.  The police was pushed by members of the 908 Taiwan Republic Campaign.

External links
Taiwan-China talks hit headwinds:Taiwan and China unexpectedly nixed 1 of 4 deals during economic talks this week. The setback comes as Taiwan's China-friendly government is losing support . The Christian Science Monitor
Thousands of Taiwanese protest China envoy's visit USA TODAY

References

Cross-Strait relations
2009 in Taiwan